Twerking Queen is the debut studio album by Italian singer Elettra Lamborghini, released on 14 June 2019 by Island and Universal.

On 14 February 2020, it was released a new edition entitled Twerking Queen (el resto es nada), with the single "Musica (e il resto scompare)" performed at the Sanremo Music Festival 2020.

Track listing

Charts

Weekly charts

Year-end charts

References

2019 albums